The 2006 Campeonato Ecuatoriano de Fútbol de la Serie A (known as the 2006 Copa Pílsener Serie A for sponsorship reasons) was the 48th season of Ecuador's Serie A, the country's top football tournament for the country's top league. El Nacional won their 13th title to tie Barcelona for the most top-flight championships in Ecuadorian football history.

Format
The Serie A returned to its year-long format this season. The tournament was composed of three stages.

The First Stage and Second Stage are identical. The ten teams competed in a double round-robin tournament, one game at home and one away. The top three teams in each stage qualified to the Liguilla Final with bonus points (3, 2, and 1 point[s], respectively). The winner of each group also qualified to the 2006 and 2007 Copa Sudamericana, respectively. At the end of each, the team with the fewest points was relegated to the Serie B.

The Liguilla Final was a double round-robin tournament between the six qualified teams of the First and Second Stage. The winner of the Liguilla Final was crowned the Serie A champion. The champion and runner-up also qualified to the 2008 Copa Libertadores into the Second Stage, while the third-place finisher qualified to the First Stage.

First stage

Second stage

Aggregate table

Liguilla Final

See also
 Serie A de Ecuador
 2006 Copa Libertadores
 2006 Copa Sudamericana
 Federación Ecuatoriana de Fútbol

External links
 FEF's official website 

Ecuadorian Serie A seasons
Ecu
Football